In graph theory, a deletion-contraction formula / recursion is any formula of the following recursive form:

Here G is a graph, f is a function on graphs, e is any edge of G, G \ e denotes edge deletion, and G / e denotes contraction. Tutte refers to such a function as a W-function. The formula is sometimes referred to as the fundamental reduction theorem. In this article we abbreviate to DC.

R. M. Foster had already observed that the chromatic polynomial is one such function, and Tutte began to discover more, including a function f = t(G) counting the number of spanning trees of a graph (also see Kirchhoff's theorem). It was later found that the flow polynomial is yet another; and soon Tutte discovered an entire class of functions called Tutte polynomials (originally referred to as dichromates) that satisfy DC.

Examples

Spanning trees
The number of spanning trees  satisfies DC.

Proof.  denotes the number of spanning trees not including e, whereas  the number including e.

Chromatic polynomials
The chromatic polynomial  counting the number of k-colorings of G does not satisfy DC, but a slightly modified formula (which can be made equivalent):

Proof. If e = uv, then a k-coloring of G is the same as a k-coloring of G \ e where u and v have different colors. There are  total G \ e colorings. We need now subtract the ones where u and v are colored similarly. But such colorings correspond to the k-colorings of  where u and v are merged.

This above property can be used to show that the chromatic polynomial  is indeed a polynomial in k. We can do this via induction on the number of edges and noting that in the base case where there are no edges, there are  possible colorings (which is a polynomial in k).

Deletion-contraction algorithm

See also 
 Inclusion–exclusion principle
 Tutte polynomial
 Chromatic polynomial
 Nowhere-zero flow

Citations

Works cited
 

Graph theory